Caprinidae is a family of rudists, a group of unusual extinct saltwater clams, marine heterodont bivalves in the order Hippuritida.

These stationary intermediate-level epifaunal suspension feeders lived in the Cretaceous period, from 140.2 to 66.043 Ma. The rudists became extinct at the end of the Cretaceous, apparently as a result of the Cretaceous–Paleogene extinction event.

Fossils of this genus have been found in the sediments of Europe, China, Cuba, Egypt, Guatemala, Jamaica, Japan, Mexico, Oman, the Philippines, Turkey, Russia, the United States and Venezuela.

Genera
 †Antillocaprina
 †Caprina
 †Caprinula
 †Caprinuloidea
 †Coalcomana
 †Conchemipora
 †Guzzyella
 †Huetamia
 †Jalpania
 †Mathesia
 †Mexicaprina
 †Muellerriedia
 †Neocaprina
 †Offneria
 †Orthoptychus
 †Pachytraga
 †Pacificaprina
 †Pantojaloria
 †Texicaprina
 †Titanosarcolites

References

Prehistoric bivalve families
Cretaceous first appearances
Cretaceous extinctions
Hippuritida